The official emblem and flag of Kavajë Municipality were approved by the Municipal Council in 2002. They were chosen between two final variants selected in a competition organized by City Hall. The winning proposal was designed by noted graphist and painter Musa Qarri. The variant which received 2nd place was designed by Fredi Yzeiri.

Design  
At the center of the flag, displayed is the emblem which consists of the clock tower, regarded as the symbol of the city; beneath the clock tower, a diamond shaped triangle in golden yellow represents wheat crops, to give the impression of a farming town; a distorted letter V that hovers below symbolizes the first anti-communist movement in Albania; the blue background conveys the color of the sea, in reference to Kavajë's coastline.

References 

Kavajë
Kavaje
Kavaje
Flags introduced in 2002